Tongpang Ozüküm is an Independent politician from Nagaland. He has been elected in Nagaland Legislative Assembly election in 2018 from Angetyongpang constituency as Independent candidate. He was minister of Housing and Mechanical in Fourth Neiphiu Rio ministry from 2018. In 2023 he was appointed as Adviser to Water Resources Department

References 

Living people
Independent politicians in India
Nagaland MLAs 2018–2023
Year of birth missing (living people)
People from Mokokchung district